The London Film-makers' Co-op, or LFMC, was a British film-making workshop founded in 1966. It ceased to exist in 1999 when it merged with London Video Arts to form LUX.

It grew out of film screenings at the Better Books bookstore, part of the 1960s counter-culture in London, before moving to the original Arts Lab on Drury Lane, then sharing offices with John 'Hoppy' Hopkins' BIT information service and then, with the breakaway group that formed the New Arts Lab, to the Camden-based Institute for Research in Art and Technology. With the end of IRAT's lease in 1971 the Co-op found a base in a long-term squat in a former dairy at 13a Prince of Wales Crescent in Kentish Town. For most of its life the LFMC was based in Gloucester Avenue in Camden in a run down building which for a number of years also housed the London Musicians Collective. In 1997 the LFMC moved together with London Video Arts to the new Lux Centre, Hoxton Square.

Founded by, amongst others, Stephen Dwoskin and Bob Cobbing, inspired by Jonas Mekas's The Film-Makers' Cooperative in New York. One difference between the New York Co-op and the LFMC was that the LFMC was organized as an egalitarian, worksharing cooperative, which assisted production as well as distribution.

It initially had close links with American experimental cinema. Carla Liss ran the co-op's distribution archive.

Filmmakers associated with the group include Malcolm Le Grice, Peter Gidal, Michael "Atters" Attree,  Carolee Schneemann, Annabel Nicolson, Lis Rhodes, Gill Eatherley, Roger Hammond, Mike Dunford, Sandra Lahire, Vera Neubauer, David Crosswaite, Philip Goring, Sanchieboots, Fred Drummond, et al. and William Raban, who managed the LFMC workshop from 1972 - 76. Sally Potter made several short films at the LFMC in the early 1970s.

Work produced by members of the LFMC in the late 1960s and early 1970s has been labelled Structural/Materialist Film.

References

External links
LFMC starts at Better Books and Notting Hill Festival - IT 1966
LUX history - LFMC is formed, 13 October 1966
British Artists' Film and Video Study Collection, online audio exhibition on the early years of the London Filmmakers' Co-op 1966 - 1968
Shoot Shoot Shoot - The First Decade of LFMC 1966-76
 Film & Video Distribution Database, database of material and information about the organisations distributing experimental film and video art in the UK, including London Film-makers' Co-op, London Video Access/Electronic Arts, Circles/Cinenova, Film and Video Umbrella, and Lux.

Experimental film
Film organisations in the United Kingdom
Filmmaker cooperatives
Co-operatives in England